Oswald Gracias (born 24 December 1944) is an Indian cardinal of the Roman Catholic Church. He was appointed Latin Church Archbishop of Bombay by Pope Benedict XVI on 14 October 2006 and was raised to the cardinalate in 2007. In 2008, he became vice-president of the Conference of Catholic Bishops of India; and in 2010, he was elected president. He was also elected secretary general and then president of the Federation of Asian Bishops' Conferences from 2010 to 2019. On 13 April 2013, he was appointed to the eight-member Council of Cardinals, informally the Council of Cardinal Advisers, established by Pope Francis to help with governing the Catholic Church and reforming its central administration. He was mentioned as a possible candidate to succeed Pope Benedict XVI in 2013.

Biography

Early life and ordination
Gracias was born in Bombay (modern-day Mumbai) to Jervis and Aduzinda Gracias (a native of Orlim, Goa). He recognises himself as a Goan Catholic.  He completed his school studies at St. Michael's School in Mahim and joined college at the Jesuit St. Xavier's College, Mumbai. After a year, he entered the Seminary of St. Pius X in Bombay, where he studied philosophy and theology. Gracias was ordained to the priesthood by Valerian Gracias (no relation) on 20 December 1970. From 1971 to 1976, he served as Chancellor and secretary to Bishop Joseph Rodericks, SJ, of Jamshedpur.

Diocesan work
Gracias attended the Pontifical Urbaniana University from 1976 to 1982; he obtained a doctorate in canon law, a diploma in jurisprudence. Upon his return to Bombay, he was named chancellor, judge of the metropolitan tribunal, and judicial vicar. From 1982, he was the chancellor of the Archdiocese of Mumbai, and from 1988 he was the judicial vicar for the archdiocese. In 1991, Gracias was made archdiocesan consultor. He also taught as a visiting professor in the seminaries of Bombay, Poona, and Bangalore. He was also president of the Canon Law Society of India.

Bishop and Archbishop
On 28 June 1997, Gracias was appointed Auxiliary Bishop of Bombay and Titular Bishop of Bladia by Pope John Paul II. He received his episcopal consecration on the following 16 September from Archbishop Ivan Dias, with Bishops Ferdinand Fonseca and Bosco Penha serving as co-consecrators. Pope John Paul named Gracias Archbishop of Agra on 7 September 2000. Pope Benedict XVI appointed him Archbishop of Bombay on 14 October 2006. He has served as secretary of the Catholic Bishops' Conference of India (CBCI), which comprises several rites, and as president of the Conference of Catholic Bishops of India, the organization of the Latin Church.

Cardinal
On 17 October 2007, Pope Benedict XVI announced that he would elevate Gracias and twenty-two other prelates to the College of Cardinals. At the consistory in St. Peter's Basilica on 24 November 2007, he was created Cardinal-Priest of San Paolo della Croce a Corviale.

On 20 February 2008 Cardinal Gracias was elected 1st vice president of the Catholic Bishops Conference of India (CBCI) of which had earlier served as secretary general.

Pope Benedict named him a member of the Pontifical Council for Legislative Texts on 6 May 2008  and of the Congregation for Divine Worship and the Discipline of the Sacraments on 6 July 2010, 

On 18 September 2008 in Washington, D.C., Gracias underwent surgery for a rare form of cancer. He recovered completely.

Gracias was elected secretary general of the Federation of Asian Bishops' Conferences (FABC) by the presidents of its 19 constituent bishops conferences representing 28 Asian countries. He led the organization from 2010 to 2019.

On 29 December 2011 he was appointed a member of the Pontifical Council for Social Communications. On 12 June 2012 Cardinal Gracias was appointed a member of the Congregation for Catholic Education. On 18 September 2012, Gracias was appointed by Pope Benedict XVI to serve as a synod father for the October 2012 Ordinary General Assembly of the Synod of Bishops on the New Evangelization. 

Both in Agra and Mumbai Gracias endorsed teaching the discipline of yoga in Catholic schools. In 2012 he wrote: "Through the prescribed postures and exercises one improves one's all round sense of well being and is able to enter into oneself so as to commune better with God."

He was mentioned as a possible candidate for election to the papacy in the 2013 conclave. He was one of the cardinal electors who participated in that conclave, which elected Pope Francis.

On 13 April 2013 he was appointed to the Council of Cardinal Advisers, a group established by Pope Francis to advise him and to study a plan for revising the Apostolic Constitution on the Roman Curia.

Gracias was elected to a two-year term as president of the CBCI on 9 February 2018.

On 6 December 2019, the Congregation for the Evangelization of Peoples notified Gracias that Pope Francis wants Gracias to remain Archbishop. Gracias had submitted his resignation as required in anticipation of his 75th birthday. On 17 February 2020, Gracias was elected to a second two-year term as president of the CBCI.

On 15 October 2020, Pope Francis renewed Gracias's term on the Council of Cardinal Advisers.

Views and theology

Humanae Vitae
Gracias delivered an address to priests in 2018 to commemorate Pope Paul VI's papal encyclical Humanae Vitae. In his address, Gracias affirmed that the Church "stands unwavering and firm in her decision to embrace and uphold life as well as embrace, nurture, defend and uplift the gift of life, every life". The cardinal referred to the encyclical as "a great gift to the Church" because it was able to set out how the Church views marriage and family life, however, the cardinal noted that the encyclical was also a reminder about the need to "invest more in marriage preparation, prepare couples for marriage and enrich the marriages of those already married".

Married clergy
Cardinal Gracias has suggested that the pathway to married priests is still an open possibility; during the 2019 Synod of Bishops the cardinal suggested in his intervention that following present canon law could present possibilities for married men to be ordained to the priesthood, mentioning that special dispensations could be granted.

Abortion
In February 2020, Gracias stated that "human life must be respected and protected absolutely from the moment of conception", pointing out that "the Church has been unwavering in its protection of the sanctity of human life, from conception until natural death". In his address given to the 32nd plenary session of the Indian Episcopal Conference in Bangalore, Gracias condemned India's new abortion bill that would extend the period to end a pregnancy to 24 weeks, declaring that "bishops have the responsibility to spread Christ's message about the dignity of all human life".

Euthanasia
In March 2011, Gracias expressed his relief at the Supreme Court's decision to reject the plea for the mercy killing of a nurse who was in a semi-comatose condition for over three decades. In remarks given to the Catholic News Service, the cardinal expressed his relief that the court rejected the plea, stating that "allowing one to die amounts to actively supporting taking away one's life".

Gallery

Arms

Notes

References

External links

 

Bio-data of Archbishop Oswald Gracias of Bombay Named Cardinal on Oct 17, 2007

1944 births
20th-century Roman Catholic bishops in India
21st-century Roman Catholic archbishops in India
Living people
Goan Catholics
Pontifical Urban University alumni
Indian cardinals
Christian clergy from Mumbai
Cardinals created by Pope Benedict XVI
Members of the Congregation for Divine Worship and the Discipline of the Sacraments
Members of the Pontifical Council for Social Communications
Members of the Congregation for Catholic Education
Roman Catholic archbishops of Agra
Indian Roman Catholic archbishops